Isaac Ngahane (9 August 1954 – 31 July 2021) was a Cameroonian politician.

Biography
Ngahane studied at the École Protestante in Manjo and the Collège d’enseignement secondaire de Bonabéri in Douala.

He ran for the National Assembly in 2002, winning a seat to represent Wouri Est. He was a member of the Cameroon People's Democratic Movement's Central Committee.

As an incumbent deputy, Isaac Ngahane died in Douala on 31 July 2021 at the age of 66.

References

1954 births
2021 deaths
21st-century Cameroonian politicians
Members of the National Assembly (Cameroon)
Cameroon People's Democratic Movement politicians
People from West Region (Cameroon)